Nénang Monastery is a historical gompa for Buddhist monks and nuns belonging to Sera Monastery. It is located west of Lhasa in   Doilungdêqên County (Tibetan Tölung) in Tibet Autonomous Region.

Nenang Monastery is the seat of the Nenang Pawo, an important tulku of the Karma Kagyu school of Tibetan Buddhism.

Geography
Above Nenang, is the Tsurphu Monastery, a monastery which served as the traditional seat of the Karmapa. A river runs through the valley. It is the location of a quarry from where aggregates are carried to Lhasa for building construction, which is raising environmental concerns. As in the case of hermitages and nunneries located in the mountainous terrain immense religiosity is associated with it. Thus, the peak surrounding this nunnery is called the Glorious Copper-Coloured Mountain, which is the name of Padmasambhava’s celestial palace, as the location was associated with Padmasambhava (Padma’byung gnas). Two large caves here were Padmasambhava’s meditation caves. Another set of caves, on the hills opposite to the hermitage were caves of the Sixteen Arhats. These sites are all now in total ruins. It is therefore hard to even accept that a live and active hermitage existed here in the past.

History
In the ninth century Padmasambhava, the Indian Buddhist guru credited with the founding of Buddhism in Tibet, lived and did penance in the caves in the precincts of the monastery. According to oral tradition, Padmasmabhava lived in this cave for three years and three months in retreat. However, establishing the nunnery here is credited to a nun named Jetsün (or Khachö) Dröldor Wangmo, inferred to be a Dakini. Some also say it was founded in 1333 by Tokden Drakpa Senge (1283–1349), the first Shamarpa. 

The nunnery flourished briefly for one more generation under an incarnate of the first nun and went into decline thereafter due to lack of further incarnated nuns. It was then brought under the jurisdiction of Khardo Hermitage. The third incarnation of Khardo Rikdzin Chökyi Dorjé made it his retreat and also established the nunnery. However, the nuns who felt insecure at this remote location wished to stay closer to Mkhar rdo. Consequently, as directed by the Thirteenth Dalai Lama, in 1930 they exchanged places with the Gnas sgo gdong monastery where monks were residing; the male monks then shifted to Gnas nang.

Post 1959
Following the Cultural Revolution in 1959, the nunnery was locked up and deteriorated into ruins. It was only about a decade ago that some nuns of this nunnery along with an elderly person (the father of one of the nuns) started building temporary huts from the ruins of the former nunnery.

Footnotes

Sera Monastery
Karma Kagyu monasteries and temples
Buddhist monasteries in Lhasa (prefecture-level city)
1333 establishments in Asia
Doilungdêqên District